O pere e 'o musso is a typical Neapolitan dish, with its name meaning "the foot and the muzzle" in Neapolitan, which refers to its main ingredients: pig's feet and cow snouts. 'O pere e 'o musso is usually sold as street food from carts, in the cities of Campania. 'O pere e 'o musso is also consumed in the region of Molise and in the province of Foggia, where the dish is regarded as a "party" food.

Preparation

Traditional recipe 
This Neapolitan culinary specialty is prepared by boiling pig's feet ('o pere) with calf's snouts ('o musso). 'O pere e 'o musso derives from popular tradition and a need to make use of less noble cuts of meat. The ingredients are depilated, boiled, cooled, cut into small pieces and served cold, seasoned with salt and lemon juice.

Additions 
Besides those already mentioned, the following ingredients are often added:
 Calf foot
 Goat foot
 The four stomachs of the calf (including tripe)
 Cow udders
 Calf uterus
 Calf rectum

The condiment of 'o pere e 'o musso includes, depending on the customer's preferences, the addition of fennel, lupins, olives and chilli.

Street food tradition 
'O pere e 'o musso can be found in traditional shops and butcheries; however, it is most popularly sold by street vendors using stalls or carts and motorized vehicles such as apecars.

In the past, the salting of the meat by the street vendors was carried out by using a characteristic instrument, a dispenser consisting of an animal horn with a hole at the end. This tool is still in use by some vendors.

Related pages 
 Neapolitan cuisine
 Street food

References 

Neapolitan cuisine
Culture in Naples
Cuisine of Campania